Vittorio Cavalotti (31 July 1893 – 2 September 1939) was an Italian cyclist. He competed in the men's sprint event at the 1920 Summer Olympics.

References

External links
 

1893 births
1939 deaths
Italian male cyclists
Olympic cyclists of Italy
Cyclists at the 1920 Summer Olympics
Cyclists from Milan